Swimming at the 1993 European Youth Summer Olympic Days was held in Valkenswaard, Netherlands.

Medal summary

Events

Boys' events

Girls' events

References

1993 European Youth Summer Olympic Days
1993 in swimming
1993